Thomas Glesby (born July 17, 1969) is a Canadian former professional boxer who competed from 1993 to 2001. As an amateur, he competed at the Summer Olympics: in 1988 and 1992. Nicknamed "The Bomb" he won the bronze medal in the men's heavyweight division at the 1991 Pan American Games in Havana, Cuba.

1988 Olympic results
Below is the record of Tom Glesby, a Canadian heavyweight boxer who competed at the 1988 Seoul Olympics:

 Round of 32: defeated Claus Nielsen (Denmark) referee stopped contest in the second round
 Round of 16: lost to Gyula Alvics (Hungary) referee stopped contest in the second round

Professional boxing record

|-
|align="center" colspan=8|26 Wins (19 knockouts, 7 decisions), 3 Losses (3 knockouts, 0 decisions), 1 Draw 
|-
| align="center" style="border-style: none none solid solid; background: #e3e3e3"|Result
| align="center" style="border-style: none none solid solid; background: #e3e3e3"|Record
| align="center" style="border-style: none none solid solid; background: #e3e3e3"|Opponent
| align="center" style="border-style: none none solid solid; background: #e3e3e3"|Type
| align="center" style="border-style: none none solid solid; background: #e3e3e3"|Round
| align="center" style="border-style: none none solid solid; background: #e3e3e3"|Date
| align="center" style="border-style: none none solid solid; background: #e3e3e3"|Location
| align="center" style="border-style: none none solid solid; background: #e3e3e3"|Notes
|-align=center
|Loss
|
|align=left| Lou Savarese
|TKO
|3
|12/06/2001
|align=left| Astro Pavilion, Houston, Texas, U.S.
|align=left|
|-
|Win
|
|align=left| Antonio Colbert
|UD
|6
|25/06/2000
|align=left| Majestic Star Casino, Gary, Indiana, U.S.
|align=left|
|-
|Win
|
|align=left| Val Smith
|PTS
|6
|27/05/2000
|align=left| Detroit, Michigan, U.S.
|align=left|
|-
|Loss
|
|align=left| Robert Davis
|TKO
|5
|02/12/1999
|align=left| Memorial Coliseum, Corpus Christi, Texas, U.S.
|align=left|
|-
|Win
|
|align=left| Jeff Lally
|TKO
|3
|24/06/1999
|align=left| Windsor, Ontario, Canada
|align=left|
|-
|Win
|
|align=left| Andre Crowder
|TKO
|1
|24/09/1998
|align=left| Madison, Tennessee, U.S.
|align=left|
|-
|Win
|
|align=left| Brian Yates
|TKO
|3
|09/09/1998
|align=left| Louisville, Kentucky, U.S.
|align=left|
|-
|Win
|
|align=left| Tosand Jewell
|TKO
|2
|30/07/1998
|align=left| Heart of St. Charles Banquet Center, Saint Charles, Missouri, U.S.
|align=left|
|-
|Win
|
|align=left| Fred Houpe
|RTD
|3
|22/06/1996
|align=left| Prince George, British Columbia, Canada
|align=left|
|-
|Win
|
|align=left| Jim Huffman
|UD
|10
|25/01/1996
|align=left| International Plaza Hotel, Toronto, Ontario, Canada
|align=left|
|-
|Win
|
|align=left| Guy Sonnenberg
|RTD
|6
|25/10/1995
|align=left| Mayfield Inn, Edmonton, Alberta, Canada
|align=left|
|-
|Win
|
|align=left| John Kiser
|UD
|10
|11/08/1995
|align=left| Welland Arena, Welland, Ontario, Canada
|align=left|
|-
|Win
|
|align=left| Carl "Little Truth" Williams
|KO
|2
|27/06/1995
|align=left| Edmonton Convention Centre, Edmonton, Alberta, Canada
|align=left|
|-
|Win
|
|align=left| George O'Mara
|TKO
|1
|28/04/1995
|align=left| Edmonton Convention Centre, Edmonton, Alberta, Canada
|align=left|
|-
|Loss
|
|align=left| Josh Imardiyi
|TKO
|2
|15/11/1994
|align=left| Erie Civic Center, Erie, Pennsylvania, U.S.
|align=left|
|-
|Win
|
|align=left| Bill Corrigan
|KO
|1
|21/10/1994
|align=left| Winnipeg Convention Centre, Winnipeg, Manitoba, Canada
|align=left|
|-
|Win
|
|align=left| Mauricio Villegas
|UD
|10
|15/09/1994
|align=left| Edmonton Convention Centre, Edmonton, Alberta, Canada
|align=left|
|-
|Win
|
|align=left| Everton Davis
|TKO
|9
|21/06/1994
|align=left| MGM Grand Las Vegas, Las Vegas, Nevada, U.S.
|align=left|
|-
|Win
|
|align=left| Mike DeVito
|TKO
|2
|09/06/1994
|align=left| Monroeville, Pennsylvania, Canada
|align=left|
|-
|Win
|
|align=left| Jeff Lampkin
|UD
|10
|22/03/1994
|align=left| Edmonton Convention Centre, Edmonton, Alberta, Canada
|align=left|
|-
|Win
|
|align=left| Ken Lakusta
|KO
|2
|17/02/1994
|align=left| Edmonton Convention Centre, Edmonton, Alberta, Canada
|align=left|
|-
|Win
|
|align=left| Dave Fiddler
|TKO
|2
|02/12/1993
|align=left| Northlands Agricom, Edmonton, Alberta, Canada
|align=left|
|-
|Win
|
|align=left| Martin Foster
|TKO
|1
|19/11/1993
|align=left| Atlantic City Convention Center, Atlantic City, New Jersey, U.S.
|align=left|
|-
|Win
|
|align=left| José Macias Chong
|KO
|2
|02/10/1993
|align=left| Grant MacEwan College, Edmonton, Alberta, Canada
|align=left|
|-
|Win
|
|align=left| Ken Jackson
|TKO
|4
|17/08/1993
|align=left| Casino Magic, Bay Saint Louis, Mississippi, U.S.
|align=left|
|-
|Draw
|
|align=left| Sajad Abdul Aziz
|PTS
|4
|23/07/1993
|align=left| Lansing, Michigan, U.S.
|align=left|
|-
|Win
|
|align=left| Conroy Nelson
|KO
|4
|29/06/1993
|align=left| Varsity Arena, Toronto, Ontario, Canada
|align=left|
|-
|Win
|
|align=left| Mike Faulkner
|UD
|6
|14/04/1993
|align=left| Fairmont Royal York, Toronto, Ontario, Canada
|align=left|
|-
|Win
|
|align=left| Isaac Knapper
|TKO
|1
|26/03/1993
|align=left| Sheraton Centre Toronto Hotel, Toronto, Ontario, Canada
|align=left|
|-
|Win
|
|align=left| Kevin P Porter
|TKO
|1
|11/02/1993
|align=left| Niagara Falls Memorial Arena, Niagara Falls, Ontario, Canada
|align=left|
|}

References
 sports-reference

1969 births
Living people
Heavyweight boxers
Super-heavyweight boxers
Boxers at the 1988 Summer Olympics
Boxers at the 1991 Pan American Games
Boxers at the 1992 Summer Olympics
Olympic boxers of Canada
Sportspeople from Welland
Pan American Games bronze medalists for Canada
Canadian male boxers
Pan American Games medalists in boxing
Medalists at the 1991 Pan American Games